The Africa Beach Soccer Cup of Nations (BSAFCON) is the main championship for beach soccer in Africa, contested between senior men's national teams who are members of the Confederation of African Football (CAF). It is the sport's version of the better known Africa Cup of Nations in association football.

The winners of the championship are crowned continental champions; the tournament also acts as the qualification route for African nations to the upcoming edition of the FIFA Beach Soccer World Cup. Coinciding with the annual staging of the World Cup, the competition took place yearly until 2009; the World Cup then became biennial, and as its supplementary qualification event, the championship followed suit.

The championship was established in 2006 when FIFA made it a requirement for all confederations to begin holding qualification tournaments to determine the best national team(s) in their region and hence those who would proceed to represent their continent in the upcoming World Cup (previously, nations were simply invited to play without having to earn their place). FIFA currently allocate Africa two berths at the World Cup and hence the top two teams (the winners and the runners-up) qualify to the World Cup finals.

Beach Soccer Worldwide (BSWW) originally organised the competition under the title FIFA Beach Soccer World Cup CAF qualifier (also known informally as the CAF Beach Soccer Championship). Despite historically having minimal input (often only sending delegates), CAF became lead organisers in 2015, establishing a qualification phase to determine the elite eight nations to compete in the tournament finals. CAF also began using the BSAFCON title to which the competition was officially renamed for the next edition, scheduled for 2017. However, CAF later announced that since three of its competitions were already held in odd-numbered years, the tournament would now be held in even-numbered years henceforth to desaturate the calendar, starting with 2016.

Senegal are the most successful nation having won the event seven times and are also the current champions. In terms of success in qualifying to the World Cup, again Senegal are the most outstanding nation, having qualified in nine out of eleven attempts; Nigeria follow close behind, with six qualifications. Mozambique had its debut in 2021 FIFA Beach Soccer World Cup.

Results
For all tournaments, the top two teams qualified for the FIFA Beach Soccer World Cup.

Medals (2006-2022)

Successful nations

Awards

Total Awards (2006-2021)

Summary (2006-2022)

Points: W = 3 points / WE = 2 points / WP = 1 points / L = 0 points

Appearances & performance timeline
The following is a performance timeline of the teams who have appeared in the Africa Beach Soccer Cup of Nations and how many appearances they each have made.

Additionally, eight teams have entered the qualification round at least once since its introduction in 2015 without having yet qualified for the finals, nor having participated in the tournament before 2015 when entry was automatic which are: Burundi, Comoros, Djibouti, Kenya, Liberia, Mali, Sudan and Tunisia. A further team, DR Congo, qualified for the 2021 tournament but withdrew before the finals began. 
Legend

 – Champions
 – Runners-up
 – Third place
 – Fourth place
5th–9th – Fifth to ninth place
R1 – Round 1 (group stage)
× – Did not enter

×× – Entered qualifying but withdrew
• – Did not qualify
•• – Qualified but withdrew
q – Qualified for upcoming tournament
 – Hosts (qualify automatically)
Apps – No. of appearances

Timeline
Entry requirements:
2006–2013: Automatic entry for all teams.
Since 2015: Eight teams qualify through the qualification round.

Performance of qualifiers at the World Cup

The following is a performance timeline of the CAF teams who appeared in the Beach Soccer World Cup since being sanctioned by FIFA in 2005.

Legend

 – Champions
 – Runners-up
 – Third place
 – Fourth place
 – Hosts

QF – Quarter-finals
R1 – Round 1 (group stage)
q – Qualified for upcoming tournament
Total – Total times qualified for World Cup

Notes

References

External links
Confederation of African Football, official website.
Beach Soccer Worldwide, official website.

 

 
Confederation of African Football competitions for national teams
Africa
Beach soccer competitions
Recurring sporting events established in 2006